Alone Together is a live album by Jim Hall and Ron Carter, released in 1973. The album was recorded at the Playboy Club in New York on August 4, 1972.

Track listing 
 "St. Thomas" (Sonny Rollins) – 4:44
 "Alone Together" (Arthur Schwartz, Howard Dietz) – 5:51
 "Receipt, Please" (Ron Carter) – 4:59
 "I'll Remember April" (Gene de Paul, Patricia Johnston, Don Raye) – 6:50
 "Softly, As in a Morning Sunrise" (Sigmund Romberg, Oscar Hammerstein II) – 2:52
 "Whose Blues?" (Jim Hall) – 5:54
 "Prelude to a Kiss" (Duke Ellington, Irving Gordon, Irving Mills) – 5:50
 "Autumn Leaves" (Joseph Kosma, Johnny Mercer, Jacques Prévert) – 6:54

Personnel 
 Jim Hall – guitar
 Ron Carter – bass

Charts

References 

Jim Hall (musician) live albums
Ron Carter live albums
1972 live albums
Milestone Records live albums